Ammotrechella stimpsoni is a species of curve-faced solifugid in the family Ammotrechidae.

References

Solifugae
Articles created by Qbugbot
Animals described in 1883